Hunter Miska (born July 7, 1995) is an American professional ice hockey goaltender who is currently playing with the Straubing Tigers in the Deutsche Eishockey Liga (DEL). He has formerly played in the National Hockey League (NHL) with the Arizona Coyotes and Colorado Avalanche.

Playing career

Amateur
Undrafted, Miska played junior hockey in the United States Hockey League and British Columbia Hockey League before embarking on collegiate hockey at the University of Minnesota at Duluth in the National Collegiate Hockey Conference.

In his freshman year with the Bulldogs in the 2016–17 season, Miska posted a 27–5–5 record with a .920 save percentage and a 2.20 goals against average with five shutouts. He helped lead the Bulldogs to the Frozen Four Championship game before falling 3–2 to the University of Denver. Miska was named as a finalist for the Mike Richter award, given annually to the goaltender voted to be the most outstanding in Division I NCAA hockey during the regular season.

Professional
Following an impressive debut season, Miska left Duluth to turn professional in signing a two-year, entry-level contract with the Arizona Coyotes on April 15, 2017. After attending his first training camp with the Coyotes, Miska was assigned to AHL affiliate, the Tucson Roadrunners, for the duration of the 2017–18 season.

In the 2018–19 season, Miska began the season continuing his tenure in the AHL with the Roadrunners. On November 6, 2018, Miska received his first recall to the NHL by the Coyotes, providing cover for the injured Antti Raanta. He made his NHL debut with the Coyotes in relief of Darcy Kuemper in a game against the Detroit Red Wings on November 13, 2018. On November 23, Miska was returned to the Roadrunners. Miska was used as an emergency recall for the Coyotes; however, he was shortly returned again to the AHL on November 30, 2018. Remaining with Tucson for the remainder of the season, Miska split duties between the pipes with Adin Hill, collecting just 10 wins in 25 games.

Having concluded his entry-level contract and as an impending restricted free agent, Miska was not tendered a qualifying offer to remain with the Coyotes, and was released to be a free agent on June 25, 2019. On July 12, 2019, Miska agreed to a one-year AHL contract with the Colorado Eagles, affiliate to the Colorado Avalanche. He began the 2019–20 season with the Eagles, before he was briefly assigned to ECHL affiliate, the Utah Grizzlies for 3 games. Upon his return to the AHL, with injury to fellow goaltender Antoine Bibeau, Miska remained with the Eagles posting 11 wins and tied fourth among all AHL goaltenders in save percentage through 19 games, before signing a one-year NHL contract for the remainder of the season with the Avalanche on February 10, 2020.

Having recorded his best season statistics in the AHL in his first year with the Eagles, Miska was re-signed by the Avalanche to a two-year, two-way contract extension on October 20, 2020. With an injury to fellow Avalanche goaltender Pavel Francouz, Miska remained on the opening night roster for the pandemic shortened  season. Serving as the backup, on January 21, 2021, Miska made his first career NHL start; he made 23 saves in a 4–2 loss to the Los Angeles Kings. On February 26, Miska recorded his first career NHL win in a 3–2 victory over the Coyotes. Unable to solidify his role through 5 appearances, Miska was returned to the AHL after he was relieved from the net in a 8-4 victory over the Anaheim Ducks on March 16, 2021.

In the final season of his contract with the Avalanche in 2021–22, Miska was unable to replicate his earlier success with the Eagles, however collected 10 wins through 17 games and featured in 2 regular season contests with the Utah Grizzlies of the ECHL.

As a free agent after three seasons within the Avalanche organization, Miska agreed to sign his first European contract by committing to a one-year deal with German club, Straubing Tigers of the DEL, on July 9, 2022.

Career statistics

Regular season and playoffs

International

Awards and honors

References

External links
 

1995 births
Living people
American men's ice hockey goaltenders
Arizona Coyotes players
Colorado Avalanche players
Colorado Eagles players
Dubuque Fighting Saints players
Ice hockey players from Minnesota
Minnesota Duluth Bulldogs men's ice hockey players
Penticton Vees players
Straubing Tigers players
Tucson Roadrunners players
Undrafted National Hockey League players
USA Hockey National Team Development Program players
Utah Grizzlies (ECHL) players